Wheatland High School is a public high school located in Wheatland, Missouri.

About
The student-teacher ratio is 11 to 1. Wheatland is recognized in Missouri and earned a bronze medal in academic achievement. The high school's student body is 97% white, with 61% being economically disadvantaged and eligible for free or reduced-price lunches. The graduation rate is 80%.

Notable alumni
Mike Parson (1973), 57th governor of Missouri

References

Education in Hickory County, Missouri
Buildings and structures in Hickory County, Missouri
Public high schools in Missouri